Joseph E. Lambert (born 1948) is a former Chief Justice of the Kentucky Supreme Court.

Born in Berea, Kentucky, Lambert received a B.S. from Georgetown College in 1970, where he became a member of the Lambda Chi Alpha fraternity, and was a staff member for United States Senator John Sherman Cooper in Washington, D.C. from 1970 to 1971. He received a J.D. from the University of Louisville School of Law in 1974, and thereafter served as a law clerk for Rhodes Bratcher of the United States District Court for the Eastern District of Kentucky, in Louisville. Lambert entered private practice in Mount Vernon, Kentucky in 1975.

Lambert was first elected to the Kentucky Supreme Court in November, 1986, representing the 3rd Supreme Court District. On October 5, 1998, he became chief justice. He served on the court until 2008. His brother Joseph served as Chief Justice of Kentucky. and his wife currently serves as Deputy Chief Justice of Kentucky.

References
Biennial Report off the Kentucky Court of Justice, Fiscal Year 1999 & Fiscal Year 2000

1948 births
Living people
Chief Justices of the Kentucky Supreme Court
Georgetown College (Kentucky) alumni
University of Louisville School of Law alumni
People from Berea, Kentucky
People from Rockcastle County, Kentucky